Antti (Anders) Piimänen (1712, Turku — 16 October 1775, Turku) was a notable 18th-century Finnish church designer and master builder, considered the originator of the 'long church' (pitkäkirkko) style characteristic of much of the South West and Tavastia regions of Finland.

Piimänen learned his trade before the formal apprenticeship system was implemented in Turku, and was only granted his official master status relatively late, in 1759. Around the same time, he was the master-builder-in-charge of the Turku Cathedral extension works.

Noted for both his masonry and carpentry skills, Piimänen is especially known for his timber construction legacy, which has influenced many later church designers.

References

1712 births
1775 deaths
People from Turku
Finnish architects